fr:Monastère Saint-Benoît de Brignoles
The  is an independent anglophone Catholic Benedictine monastery located in the commune of Brignoles,  from Toulon, France. The Bishop of Fréjus-Toulon established the monastery as a Public Association of the Faithful in 2011. The current location was purchased in 2020. The Association was suppressed in June 2022 after two members of the community were ordained priest and deacon without the bishop's knowledge. The suppression has been appealed and the monks have indicated they intend to continue their traditional life of prayer, study, and work regardless of the outcome.

History

The Templars and the Hospitallers 
At the beginning of the 11th century, a family from Rians built the Romanesque church, which they later gave, in 1025, to the abbey of Saint-Victor de Marseille. It was later acquired by the Order of the Templars in the 12th century, shortly after their creation. The Knights Templar enlarged the domain by constructing new buildings, which took the name of Saint-Christophe because it was now suitable for receiving pilgrims on their way to the Holy Land, via the nearby Via Aurelia.

In 1312, when Pope Clement V ordered the dissolution of the Order, this house of the Templars (or secondary commandery) came under the jurisdiction of the Order of St. John of Jerusalem, then under the commandery of Beaulieu.

21st century 
The old commandery came back to religious life in August 2020, when several members of an English-speaking community, already present in La Garde-Freinet since 2011, purchased the property and renamed it Monastère Saint-Benoît after their community. The monastery church was once again given its medieval dedication to Saint Christopher. Building projects to restore the heritage buildings are underway.

Buildings 
The monastery buildings were listed as historical monuments on 21 December 1984. The site is also listed as a cultural heritage monument.

The monastery is the depository of several monastic relics, including Blessed Notker the Stammerer and Saint Lambert of Maastricht.

Monastic life 
The monastery, now dedicated to the founder of the Benedictines, respects the rule of Saint Benedict in its daily life; the prayers of the canonical hours punctuate the routines of the day. The monastery celebrates the offices according to the older monastic and Tridentine Rite. During Holy Week, the Roman Missal of 1953, the edition before the reorganization of Pope Pius XII, is used.

The monastic community consists of three monks, of whom one is a novice, clothed on 10 July 2022 (that is, his investiture). The number of the monastery's oblates and associates continues to grow.

The Australian Dom Alcuin Reid is its prior and founder. He was ordained a priest, with another monk ordained a deacon, clandestinely and outside France, in April 2022. The bishop of the Diocese of Fréjus-Toulon, Dominique Rey, then suspended the two monks ordained, although they argued it was invalid, indicating that he had not given authorization for this ordination. In a statement published on the monastery's website, the ordination was defended as being the recommendation of the canonical visitation of the diocese and necessary to protect the liturgical integrity of the monastery, which had lacked a resident priest. On 10 June 2022, Dominique Rey suppressed the public association of the faithful "under pressure from the Vatican." The monastery is still open and active and the monks have stated their intention to remain faithful to their life and vocation regardless of sanctions imposed on them by Church authorities.

References

External links 
 Official website
 Dom Alcuin Reid - Essays in Catholic Word Report
 Facebook Page
 YouTube channel

Church buildings of the Knights Hospitaller
Traditionalist Catholicism
Order of Saint Benedict
Benedictine monasteries in France
Communities using the Tridentine Mass